The Mangghud, or Manghud (Mangud), were a Mongol tribe of the Urud-Manghud federation. They established the Nogai Horde in the 14th century and the Manghit dynasty to rule the Emirate of Bukhara in 1785. They took the Islamic title of Emir instead of the title of Khan, since they were not descendants of Genghis Khan and rather based their legitimacy to rule on Islam. The clan name was used for Mongol vanguards as well. Their descendants live in several regions of the former Mongol Empire.

Manghuds in the Mongol Empire 

According to ancient sources, they were derived from the Khiyad Mongols. The Manghuds and the Uruuds were war-like people from the Mongolian plateau. Some notable Manghud warriors supported Genghis Khan (1162–1227), while a body of them resisted his rise to power. When the Mongol Empire began to expand westward, the Manghud people were spread westward into the Middle East along with many other Mongol tribes. In the Golden Horde, the Manghuds supported Nogai (d. 1299) and established their own semi-independent horde from the khans in Sarai.

After Nogai's death in 1299, the majority of Manghud warriors joined the service of Tokhta Khan. Their chieftain Edigu, the powerful warlord of the Golden Horde, officially founded Nogai Horde or Manghit Horde in the 14th-15th century. Turkish historians would record their tribal name as Manghit or Nogais, as opposed to the original Manghud or Mangudai.

Military unit of the Mongols 

The mangudai or mungadai were military units of the Mongol Empire, but sources differ wildly in their descriptions. One source states that references to Mongol light cavalry "suicide troops" date back to the 13th century.
However, a United States Army author believes that Mangudai was the name of a 13th-century Mongol warlord who created an arduous selection process to test potential leaders.  The term is used by element of the United States Army as a name for multi-day tests of Soldiers' endurance and warrior skills.

Nogai Horde 

Some of the Manghuds assimilated into Turkic people and these Manghuds became Manghit (Mangit) tribe of the Turks. The Nogais protected the northern borders of Astrakhan and Crimean khanates, and through organized raids to the northern steppes prevented Russian and Lithuanian settlements. Many Nogais joined the service of Crimean khan. Settling there, they contributed to the formation of the Crimean Tatars. However, Nogais were not only good soldiers, they also had considerable agricultural skills. Their basic social unit was the semi-autonomous 'ulus' or band. But Nogais were proud of their nomadic traditions and independence, which they considered superior to settled agricultural life.

At the beginning of the 17th century, the Kalmyks or the Oirats, migrated from the steppes of southern Siberia on the banks of the Irtysh River to the Lower Volga region about 1630. The Kalmyks expelled the Nogais who fled to the plains of northern Caucasus and to the Crimea under the Ottoman Empire. A few part of them joined to Kazakh Khanate as part of Little jüz.

Manghit dynasty 

The Manghits had been settled by Genghis Khan around the city of Qarshi. Qarshi would continue to serve as the Manghits' base of power under the Bukhara Khanate. In the 18th century, the basins of the Amu Darya and Syr Darya passed under the control of three Uzbek khanates, claiming legitimacy in their descent from Genghis Khan. These were, from west to east, the Qunggirats based on Khiva in Khwārezm (1717–1920), the Mangits in Bukhara (1753–1920), and the Mings in Kokand (Qǔqon; c. 1710–1876).

The Manghit dynasty was founded by a common Uzbek family that ruled the Emirate of Bukhara from 1785 to 1920. Manghit power in the Khanate of Bukhara began to grow in the early 18th century, due to the emirs position as ataliq to the khan.  The family effectively came to power after Nader Shah's death in 1747, and the assassination of the ruling Abu al-Fayz Khan and his young son Abdalmumin by the ataliq Muhammad Rahim Bi.

From 1747 to the 1780s, the Manġits ruled behind the scenes, until the emir Shah Murad declared himself the open ruler, establishing the Emirate of Bukhara.  The last emir of the dynasty, Mohammed Alim Khan, was ousted by the Soviet Red Army in September 1920, and fled to Afghanistan. There is disagreement over whether the dynasty descends from simple Uzbeks or of true Mongolian origin. According to the Russian orientalist N.V. Khanykova, the Manġit dynasty was considered the oldest Uzbek family in the Bukhara Khanate descending from Timur Malik; from the division of which the tuk came the reigning dynasty, in addition, this clan enjoyed some special privileges.

The Manghit dynasty issued coins from 1787 up until the Soviet takeover.

Heads/rulers of the Manghit dynasty of the Emirate of Bukhara 

Pink Rows Signifies progenitor chiefs serving as Tutors (Ataliqs)  & Viziers to the Khans of Bukhara.
Green Rows Signifies chiefs who took over reign of government from the Janids and placed puppet Khans.

Descendants 

Their descendants, the Nogai and Karakalpak people live in Dagestan and Khorazm. Others are the present-day Khalkha Mongols who live in Mongolia and the Baarin banner in Inner Mongolia. While the Manghits are found among the Tatars in Russia, the Bashkirs and the Kazakhs.

The daughter of the last Emir Alim Khan, Shukria Alimi Raad, worked as a broadcaster for Radio Afghanistan. Shukria Raad left Afghanistan with her family three months after Soviet troops invaded the country in December 1979. With her husband, also a journalist, and two children she fled to Pakistan, and then through Germany to the United States. In 1982 she joined the Voice of America, working for many years as a broadcaster for VOA's Dari Service, editor, program host and producer. Alim Khan also had a son named Shahmurad, who denounced his father in 1929 (at the age of seven) and later served in the Soviet Army. During his governance in Bukhara, he also had a son named Qasem who was killed by the Bolshevik revolutionaries. Qasem had only one son who, when he was 13 years old, escaped from Bukhara to Iran-Mashhad with his stepfather. When he arrived in Iran, he took the name Husein Bukharaei. He married Bibimeymanat Mohsenolhoseini in Mashhad. They had 6 sons and 4 daughters. Husein Bukharaei died in 1993. Their children (Hasan, Lo'ba, Ali, Narges, Qasem, Reza, Fatemeh, Mohammad, Mahmoud, Mahboubeh) all live in Mashhad. In 2020, the BBC World Service made a documentary called "Bukhara" about the last ruler of Bukhara, which refers to the fate of the family of Amir Alam Khan. Alim Khan's descendants include granddaughter Nailaj Naebzadeh from his daughter Razia Alimi, and great-granddaughter Kadeij Naebzadeh. They live in United States. Nailaj Naebzadeh was born in United States. Just like her aunt, Shukria Alimi Raad, her mother Razia Alimi too escaped from Afghanistan during the invasion of the Soviet Army in 1979.

See also 

 History of Tajikistan § Manghit dynasty (1756–1920)

References

Further reading

External links 
 History of the Khanate of Bukhara

Military history of the Mongol Empire
Nirun Mongols
Emirate of Bukhara
Borjigin
Mongol dynasties